Nicolò Vittori (13 March 1909 – 26 May 1988) was an Italian rower who competed in the 1928 Summer Olympics and in the 1936 Summer Olympics.

Vittori was born in Izola in 1909, which at that time belonged to Austria-Hungary. After WWI, the town was part of Italy and Vittori represented that country. In 1928 he won the gold medal as member of the Italian boat in the coxed four event. Eight years later he was part of the Italian boat which was eliminated in the repêchage of the coxed four competition.

References

1909 births
1988 deaths
People from Izola
Italian male rowers
Olympic rowers of Italy
Rowers at the 1928 Summer Olympics
Rowers at the 1936 Summer Olympics
Olympic gold medalists for Italy
Olympic medalists in rowing
Medalists at the 1928 Summer Olympics
European Rowing Championships medalists